Vice Admiral Sir Geoffrey Schomberg Arbuthnot,  (18 January 1885 – 4 October 1957) was a senior officer in the Royal Navy.

Naval career
Born in Havant, Hampshire, on 18 January 1885, Arbuthnot was the son of Admiral Charles Ramsay Arbuthnot and Emily Caroline Schomberg. Educated at the Royal Naval College, Dartmouth, Arbuthnot joined the Royal Navy in 1900 and fought in the First World War, where he was mentioned in despatches and was awarded the Distinguished Service Order in 1919. He was appointed Naval Member of the Ordnance Committee at Woolwich in 1927 and then given command of the cruiser  in 1929. He was made Naval Aide-de-Camp to King George VI in 1936. In 1937 he became Fourth Sea Lord and Chief of Supplies and Transport. He also served in the Second World War and, having been Commander-in-Chief, East Indies Station from 1941 to 1942, Arbuthnot was made a Knight Commander of the Order of the Bath (1942) and a Knight of the French Legion of Honour. He was Chairman of the Honours and Awards Committee from 1942 to 1945 when he retired.

Family
On 22 October 1913, he married Jessie Marguerite Henderson, second daughter of William Henderson of Berkeley House, Frome. They three children; Mary Marguerite (1914–1999), Lieutenant Peter Charles Reginald  (1915–1941) and Michael Geoffrey Henderson  (1919–1967).

References

Further reading

External links
 

|-

1885 births
1957 deaths
Military personnel from Hampshire
People from Havant
Geoffrey
Royal Navy admirals of World War II
Companions of the Distinguished Service Order
Knights Commander of the Order of the Bath
Recipients of the Legion of Honour
Lords of the Admiralty
Royal Navy officers of World War I
Royal Navy vice admirals
Admiralty personnel of World War II